Gotham City Impostors was a first-person shooter multiplayer-only video game developed by Monolith Productions and published by Warner Bros. Interactive Entertainment. Set in the universe of DC Comics' Batman, it consists of two teams of six players which try to kill the other team: one with amateur vigilantes dressed like Batman, and the other with criminals dressed like his archenemy, the Joker. It features customizable characters and a range of both traditional and imagined weapons.

Unlike other Batman games, Gotham City Impostors was not physically released. It was released on Xbox 360 via Xbox Live Arcade, PlayStation 3 via the PlayStation Network and Microsoft Windows via Games for Windows – Live in February 2012. The game was re-released on Microsoft Windows as a free-to-play title on August 30, 2012 via Steam using Steamworks.

Gameplay
 Gotham City Impostors is playable by, at the most, 12 players simultaneously. Players can customize their costume, gadgets and other aspects of the game. It features a colorful and over-the-top visual style, including such settings as an amusement park. In addition to guns and knives, the players are able to use other gadgets such as grappling hooks, glider wings, roller skates and explosives. The game includes both conventional guns and outlandish weapons, including a grenade fashioned like a jack-in-the-box and a rocket launcher made of PVC piping.

The game has four different modes: Psych Warfare, Fumigation, Bounty Hunter, and Team Deathmatch. Psych Warfare involves the two teams trying to bring a battery back to their base and defend it long enough for it to allow a machine to brainwash the other team. Fumigation sends players to capture and hold three gasblasters, a type of command post, to get their gas level to 100%. Players are treated to the sight of the enemy being swarmed by bats (if the Bats win), or suffocated by a poison cloud (if the Jokerz win). In Bounty Hunter, you win the match by collecting coins enemy players drop when they die; you can also pick up your teammates' dropped coins to deny the other team points. In Team Deathmatch, the goal is to kill enemy players as fast as possible. There are also Challenges; these are played alone, and are used to master gadgets and earn extra experience. Lastly, there is a training mode called Initiation, where the Bats' leader instructs the player on how to use weapons and gadgets.

Development and marketing

Batman: Impostors, a storyline that ran through Detective Comics #867-870 (Sept.-Dec. 2010), was inspired by Gotham City Impostors. The premise for the storyline is that the impostor Jokers were created by Winslow Heath, a man who was a victim of Joker venom early in Batman's career as a result of narcotics that he had ingested before he was exposed to the venom, Heath survived the attack, but was left paralyzed while fully conscious for years; his mouth twisted into a permanent duplicate of the Joker's own smile. When he regained full mobility, he discovered that his girlfriend, Beth – who was exposed to the Joker venom under the same circumstances, as the two took the same drugs - was left to die in their apartment as Batman was so caught up in trying to catch the Joker that he never looked back after 'rescuing' Heath, with the result that Beth was left to get eaten alive by crows. Driven insane by the torment that he endured in the hospital, Heath called himself the Impostor Joker and created a unique 'Joker juice' he named Formula 5 that would turn those who used it into temporary duplicates of the Joker with a significant high in the process, simultaneously posing as the Impostor Batman to rally others to also become impostor Batmen, go up against the impostor Jokers and trigger a gang war. Although Batman deduced the truth and defeated Heath (who later escaped), he was left troubled at the implication that Heath was correct in his statement that Batman creates his own villains.

The preview for Cartoon Network's upcoming animation block DC Nation Shorts in 2012 included animation of Gotham City Impostors. Downloadable content was released for all platforms and includes new weapons, costumes, and three new stages: the 25th Floor, Arkham Asylum, and the East End.

The game went free-to-play in 2012, but since then no new updates have been released. In the game's menu it was announced that, due to GameSpy shutting down on May 31, 2014, the servers for the PS3 version will shut down. As of July 25, 2014, all PS3 servers for Gotham City Impostors have been shut down and the game is now unplayable.

It was released for free as part of the Xbox Live Games with Gold program on July 1, 2014.

Gotham City Impostors was removed from Steam in August 2021 and is no longer obtainable.

Reception

The Escapist writer Allistair Pinsof called the demo a "carbon copy" of Call of Duty first-person shooter games, but said it added enough new features to be enjoyable. G4 writer Leah Jackson said of the playable demo: "Quite frankly, the game doesn't feel like your run of the mill downloadable title. It controls great, looks fantastic, and with all of the options, I can say that I was quite impressed." The game scored a 65/100 on Metacritic.

See also

DC Nation Shorts

References

External links

Monolith Productions page

2012 video games
Batman video games
First-person shooters
Free-to-play video games
Games for Windows certified games
LithTech games
Monolith Productions games
PlayStation 3 games
PlayStation Network games
Video game spin-offs
Video games developed in the United States
Windows games
Xbox 360 games
Xbox 360 Live Arcade games
Warner Bros. video games
Video games using Havok
Gotham City
Video games set in the United States